The Arado Ar 232 Tausendfüßler (German: "Millipede"), sometimes also called Tatzelwurm, was a cargo aircraft, designed and built in small numbers by the German firm Arado Flugzeugwerke during World War II. The design introduced, or brought together, almost all of the features now considered to be standard in modern cargo transport aircraft designs, including a box-like fuselage slung beneath a high wing; a rear loading ramp (that had first appeared on the December 1939-flown Junkers Ju 90 V5 fifth prototype four-engined transport via its Trapoklappe); a high-mounted twin tail for easy access to the hold; and various features for operating from rough fields. Although the Luftwaffe was interested in replacing or supplementing its fleet of outdated Junkers Ju 52/3m transports, it had an abundance of types in production at the time, and did not purchase large numbers of the Ar 232.

Development
Even before the prototypes were complete in 1941, the Focke-Wulf Fw 190 project had been earmarked to use the BMW 801A/B, and was proving to be a capable design, with each BMW 801 radial weighing about 1,012 kg (2,231 lb). Production of the BMW 801 was insufficient to supply this new demand, and the Ar 232 was forced to use another engine. Eventually, the BMW Bramo 323 Fafnir nine-cylinder radial, itself weighing some 550 kg (1,210 lbs), from Focke-Wulf's Fw 200 land-based maritime patrol aircraft as an alternate powerplant choice was selected instead, as it was already in production and could meet requirements if the Ar 232 really did replace the Ju 52/3m in service. The prototypes were far enough along that switching engines would have seriously delayed the program, so the first two were to be completed as the Ar 232A, and the third and a newly ordered fourth as the Ar 232B. The third and fourth prototypes (and all production aircraft) used four engines (in place of the two specified in the RLM specification) in order to provide the desired performance.

The first two prototypes, bearing the Stammkennzeichen alphabetic codes GH+GN and VD+YA respectively, started trials in early 1941. The first flight resulted in the collapse of the nose gear, but the twenty-two "millipede wheels" saved the aircraft from damage. A further ten pre-production machines were built, and were used operationally as the Ar 232A-0 while awaiting production versions. In general, the Ar 232 completely outperformed the Ju 52/3m. It carried roughly double the load over longer distances, operated from shorter runways and rougher fields if need be, and cruised about 70 km/h (44 mph) faster.

The Ar 232B program ran at the same time. With the quartet of 895 kW (1,200 hp) Bramo 323s replacing the twin BMW 801s, each Bramo 323 with its aforementioned 550 kg dry weight apiece; power increased from 2,386 kW (3,200 hp) to 3,580 kW (4,800 hp), solving the A model's problem of having little excess power in case of engine failure. This change also required the wing to be extended slightly, the span increasing just over 3 m (9 ft 10 in) in total. The extra weight of the Bramo nine-cylinder engines also moved the center of gravity forward, which was offset by stretching the cargo area rearward another meter, adding to the cargo capacity it could carry internally.

Two four-engined prototypes were ordered, the V3 and V4, and V3 first flew in May 1942. A further 10 were then ordered as the Ar 232B-0, and were used widely in an operational role. However, this was the only order for the design, as the Luftwaffe gave transport aircraft production a very low priority. Many of those produced were used by Arado to transport aircraft parts between its factories, and did not see front-line service.

Plans were also made to replace the outer wing sections and control surfaces with wooden versions to conserve aluminium. Originally to be known as the Ar 232C, the design dragged on and was later renamed the Ar 432. Plans were finally put into place to start production in October 1945, but the war ended without even a prototype being produced. Two even larger planned versions, the Ar 532 and the Ar 632, would have almost doubled the wingspan to 60 m (196 ft 10 in), as large as Germany's six-engined BV 238 flying boat design, and added another two engines.

Two of the B-0s were captured by British forces at the end of the war. After test flights by Eric "Winkle" Brown, who gave the design excellent marks, they were used by the Royal Air Force on flights between England and Germany after the war.

Design
The Ar 232 design resulted from a tender offered by the Reichsluftfahrtministerium (German Air Ministry, RLM) in late 1939 for a replacement for the Ju 52/3m transport. Both Arado and Henschel were asked for rear-loading designs powered by two 1,193 kW (1,600 hp) BMW 801A/B radial engines, which was just entering prototype production and not currently used on any front-line designs. The Arado design beat out Henschel's after an examination of the plans, and an order for three prototypes was placed in 1940.

Wilhelm van Nes led the design of the Ar 232. He began at the cargo area, with a bay directly behind the "stepless cockpit" that was 6.6 m (21 ft 7¾ in) long, 2.3 m (7 ft 6½ in) wide and 2.0 m (6 ft 6¾ in) high. Typical designs of the era used a side-mounted door for access, but the Ar 232 used hydraulically powered clamshell-doors on the rear of the bay with a ramp to allow cargo to be rolled into the hold. The twin tail configuration tail surfaces were mounted on the end of a long boom to keep the area behind the doors clear so trucks could drive right up to the ramp, much like the 1944-era American Fairchild C-82 Packet of a differing twin boom fuselage configuration. The high-set tail on its "pod-and-boom" configuration fuselage allowed the Ar 232 to be loaded and unloaded faster than other designs.

For short-field performance, the Ar 232 incorporated Arado's own "travelling flap" design for the entire rear surface of the wing. Even loaded to 16,000 kg (35,270 lb), it could take-off in 200 m (656 ft). This distance could be further reduced by using Starthilfe liquid fuelled monopropellant rocket assist (RATO) jettisonable propulsion units for take-off.

Normally operated by a crew of four, the pilot was the only member without two roles. The navigator operated a 13 mm (.51 in) MG 131 machine gun in the nose, the radio operator a 20 mm MG 151 cannon in a rotating turret on the roof, and the loadmaster a 13 mm (.51 in) MG 131 machine gun firing rearward from the extreme rear of the cargo bay above the cargo doors.

Landing gear design innovations
The most noticeable feature of the Ar 232 was the landing gear. Normal operations from prepared runways used a tricycle gear — a then-novel feature for German military aircraft—but the sideways-retracting main gear's lever-action lower oleo-strut suspended arm – carrying the main gear's wheel/tire unit at the bottoms of the maingears' struts could "break", or kneel, after landing to place the fuselage closer to the ground and thereby reduce the ramp angle. An additional set of eleven smaller, non-retractable twinned wheels per side, mounted along the ventral centreline of the fuselage from just behind the semi-retractable nosewheel aftwards to just forward of the wing's trailing edge, supported the aircraft once the main landing gear's lever-action lower arm had "knelt", or could be used for additional support when landing on soft or rough airfields. The aircraft was intended to be capable of taxiing at low speeds on its row of small wheels, thus being able to negotiate small obstacles such as ditches up to 1.5 m (5 ft) in width. The appearance of the row of small wheels led to the nickname "millipede". In flight, the main legs fully retracted inwards into the wings, while the fixed support wheels remained exposed and the nose wheel only semi-retracted, with the nosewheel tire's lowest point while retracted never going above the lowest point of the 22 auxiliary centre-line wheels' tires.

Variants
Ar 232 V1 & V2Ar 232A prototypes and research aircraft, powered by two 1,193 kW (1,600 hp) BMW 801A/B engines.

Ar 232 V3 & V4Ar 232B prototypes and research aircraft, powered by four BMW Bramo 323R-2 Fafnir engines.

Ar 232APre-production aircraft used for operational trials, powered by two BMW801 engines, only ten built.

Ar 232BThe first production aircraft powered by four Bramo 323 Fafnir engines, only ten built as Ar 232B-0.

Ar 232CA redesigned version using wood for outer wing sections and control surfaces; redesignated Ar 432.

Ar 432Redesignation of Ar 232C.

Ar 532Planned enlarged four-engined version of the Ar 432.

Ar 632Planned enlarged four-engined version of the Ar 432.

Operators

 Luftwaffe

Specifications (Ar 232B)

See also

References

Notes

Further reading

External links

 Soviet-era film about the Ar 232 (mistakenly named the "Ar 332" – in Russian with English subtitles)

Ar 232
1940s German military transport aircraft
Four-engined tractor aircraft
Aircraft first flown in 1941
Four-engined piston aircraft